The Belgian Cup ([]) is the main knockout football competition in Belgium, run by the Royal Belgian FA. The competition started in 1908 with provincial selections as the "Belgian Provinces Cup". Starting from 1912 only actual clubs were allowed to partake. As of 1964, the Belgian Cup has been organised annually. Since the 2015–16 edition, the Belgian Cup is called the Croky Cup, for sponsorship purposes. The final traditionally takes place at the Heysel Stadium in Brussels.

The most successful cup club is Club Bruges with 11 Belgian cups in their possession. The current champions are KAA Gent, having beaten Anderlecht on penalties in the 2022 final. The winners are awarded a challenge cup and qualify for the UEFA Europa League and the Belgian Supercup.

History

First national cup competitions 
The first cup competition ever in Belgium was held in 1907–08 but the teams were not actual teams but were provincial selections. The winner would be awarded a silver trophy by prince Albert. Football was especially played in Brussels and Antwerp. In West and East Flanders, notably Bruges and Ghent, football was also becoming more and more loved. In Wallonia, football was adored around the city of Liège. The province of West Flanders won to that of Antwerp by 6–2. The next year, the province of Antwerp beat that of Brabant by 5–2. The cup was then suspended after two years.

In 1912, the Belgian Cup made a first return. This time only actual clubs from the two highest levels were allowed to partake. 16 clubs would fight for the Kings' Cup in a knockout competition. Racing Club de Bruxelles won the first Belgian Cup for clubs, after beating RC de Gand in the final. The competition would return the next year. This time, preliminary rounds would be organised so regional could partake as well. Union Saint-Gilloise would go on and win this edition's final after extra time. Having already won the national league three weeks before, the team became the first double winners in Belgian football history. They would end up winning the cup the following year as well.

During the First World War, no organised association football was played in Belgium. It would take until 1926–27 for the Belgian Cup to make its comeback. t's also the first time the competition is officially named the Belgian Cup. This edition would be won by R Cercle Sportif Brugeois, the first Flemish team to achieve this. They also won the national league, which made them the second team to win the Belgian double. Unfortunately, the cup fell into disgrace among the leading clubs at the time. During the interbellum the competition would only be organised one more time, in 1935–36. The 1944 edition was never finished.

In 1953, the Belgian Cup made another comeback. This edition of the cup would be won by Standard Liège, the first Walloon team to do so. Three years later, a poll was organized after which the Belgian cup was stopped once again.

Gateway to Europe 
The foundation of the European Cup Winners' Cup is the main reason an annual cup tournament was brought back to life in 1963-164. The first four editions of this European Cup had no Belgian participants due to the absence of a national cup.

Since 1964, the Belgian Cup winner would be qualified for the European Cup Winners' Cup, until its discontinuation in 1999. From then on, the cupholders would get a place in the UEFA cup, which became the UEFA Europa League in ten years later. Since 2021, the winner will enter the European competition in the play-off round. Because teams have to play a fewer number of games compared to the national league to get a European ticket, the Belgian Cup was nicknamed 'The quickest way to Europe'. This meant the top teams grew more interest in the national cup, which increased the prestige of the competition. Due to all of this, the traditional big three of Belgian football (FC Bruges, RSC Anderlecht and Standard Liège) would win the cup the most times. The most successful cup club is Club Brugge KV with 11 cups followed by Anderlecht with 9 and Standard Liège with 8. Bruges would go on and win the double twice, in 1976–77 and 1995–96. Anderlecht has won one more, in 1964–65, 1971–72 and 1993–94.

KV Mechelen won the cup in 2019 as well as becoming champions in the First Division B, winning the small double. It was the second time a team from the second level won the cup and the first time it came with a European ticket. Due to being involved in a fraud scandal, the club wasn't allowed to enter the European competitions for a year. Their European ticket was passed on to Standard Liège based on the standings in the Jupiler Pro League. All the lower tickets were passed on as well. This meant that, of all teams, losing finalists KAA Gent got into the UEFA Europa League at the very last minute.

Venues 
The three finals in the 1950s were played in the Heysel Stadium in Brussels. Since the competitions annual return in 1964, this stadium has hosted the final. The only exceptions were between 1985 and 1987 and 1992–1995. During these years, the final was played four times in the Constant Vanden Stock Stadium in Anderlecht, twice in the Olympiastadium in Bruges and once in the Stade Maurice Dufrasne in Liège.

Trophy 
The first design was used for the three editions in the 1950s. Since 1964, a second design has been given to the cup winner. This team can keep the trophy for 11 months, until it's returned to the RBFA. This means the trophy is a real challenge cup and has gotten some bumps and scratches along the years. Every player and member of staff of the winning side is awarded a miniature trophy. The referees and losing side get medals.

The current trophy features a silver loving-cup design. Ribbons in the victors' colors are tied along the ears. There's no real front or rear side, but a Dutch and French side. The Dutch side reads "Beker van België wisseltrofee aangeboden door dagblad Les Sports", the French side "Coupe de Belgique challenge offert par le journal Les Sports". Both mean the same thing and translates to "Belgian Cup challenge offered by newspaper Les Sports". Every victor since 1964 and the corresponding year are engraved on the cup as well.

Naming 
The first two editions of the Belgian Cup were played with provincial sides. During this time, the competition was called Belgian Provinces Cup (Beker der Belgische Provincies in Dutch, Coupe des Provinces Belges in French). The editions before World War 1 were known as the Kings' Cup (Beker van de Koning in Dutch, Coupe du Roi in French). Every edition of the cup after 1918 was called the Belgian Cup (Beker van België in Dutch, Coupe de Belgique in French).

In the 1995–96 season, a sponsored name was first introduced. Coca-Cola had bought the naming rights for five seasons, and named the competition the Coca-Cola Cup. There was no sponsored name between 2001 and 2007. In January 2008, the Belgian FA announced Cofidis had bought the naming rights for 300,000 euros. Eight editions of the Cofidis Cup would be played. After Club Bruges won their 11th cup in 2015, Croky became the new main sponsor of the tournament. The Belgian cup is called the Croky Cup to date.

Competition format

Overview
Beginning in July or August, the competition proceeds as a knockout tournament throughout, consisting of eight rounds, a semi-final and then a final. All teams playing at the national level of football (Levels 1 through 5) are expected to participate, together with the top teams from the Belgian Provincial Leagues. The provinces each receive a number of entries depending on their number of inhabitants. To determine which teams from each province can participate, each province can devise their own ruling, but commonly tickets are awarded to the best performing teams in each respective provincial cup tournament of the prior season, with any remaining tickets awarded to the highest finishing teams not already qualified in the highest provincial league. As a result, most teams from the Provincial Leagues participating in the Belgian Cup are playing in the top two provincial divisions, although each season a few teams from the lower divisions succeed in qualifying.

A system of byes ensures clubs above Level 5 enter the competition at later stages. In round 1 only, teams are grouped geographically prior to the draw to reduce travel costs for smaller teams. The clubs active in European football only enter the competition in round 7. Youth teams, active in level 4 to 2, are not allowed to compete. No seeding occurs. In rounds five through seven, in case an amateur team (Level 3 or below) is drawn against a professional team (Level 2 or above), the amateur team will always receive home advantage if their ground meets the regulation specifications. The final is played at the King Baudouin Stadium.

In the first three rounds, fixtures ending in a tie are decided by penalty kicks immediately, extra time is only played from round four onwards and possibly followed by penalty kicks if necessary. The semi-final round is the only round played over two legs; as such, extra time and penalty kicks can only occur in the return match. The away-goal-rule is not applied in the semi-finals.

Schedule
Qualified entrants from the provincial leagues (levels 6 through 9) begin the competition in the first round together with teams from the Belgian Third Amateur Division (level 5). Clubs from higher levels are then added in later rounds, as per the table below. The months in which rounds are played are traditional, with exact dates subject to each year's calendar.

Belgian Cup winners and finalists

Performance by club 

 italic clubs dissolved or merged

Media coverage

Domestic coverage 
The broadcasting rights for the Croky Cup are held by Eleven Sports. Due to the RBFA's obligation that broadcast cup games are free to watch, Eleven doesn't air the matches on their own platforms. DPG Media (on VTM 2) selects and buys games to air on Flemish television and RTL (on Club RTL) does the same for the French Community. DPG Media sells some games to VRT, who broadcast these games on Sporza. The final is always broadcast on VTM 2 in Flanders.

Teams whose games haven't been chosen for broadcasting are allowed to broadcast these games themselves. Regional broadcasters often try to buy the broadcasting rights to games between sides from that region, if DPG Media or RTL didn't select those games.

International coverage 

Eleven Sports holds the rights for the First Division A, First Division B, Supercup and Women's Super League as well. This means that the international broadcasters are almost identical for the Belgian Cup.

References

External links 

 Belgian Cup the Royal Belgian Football Association's website

 
Football competitions in Belgium
Belgium
Recurring sporting events established in 1911
Annual sporting events in Belgium